Tulubayevo (Tulıbay) is a rural locality (a village) in Dyomsky Selsoviet, Bizhbulyaksky District, Bashkortostan, Russia. The population was 319 as of 2010. There are 5 streets.

Geography 
Tulubayevo is located 34 km southeast of Bizhbulyak (the district's administrative centre) by road. Islamgulovo is the nearest rural locality.

References 

Rural localities in Bizhbulyaksky District